Seven vessels of the British Royal Navy have been named HMS Espoir, after the French word for "hope":
 The first HMS Espoir was a sloop sold on 23 March 1784, origin unknown.
  was a French brig-sloop of fourteen 6-pounder guns that  captured in the Mediterranean. She was sold in September 1804. 
  was a  launched on 22 September and broken up in April 1821. 
  was  launched on 9 May, and sold in 1857.
  was a  launched 6 January, and armed with one 68-pounder and four 24-pounder howitzers. In 1869 she was converted to a dredger with the designation YC19. She was broken up in Bermuda in June 1881.
  was a  launched on 2 November and armed with two 64-pounder guns and two 20-pounder smoothbores. She was converted to a tug in 1895 and on the sale list in 1903.
 The last HMS Espoir was laid down for the Royal Navy on 23 October 1942 in Seattle as HMS Espoir (BAM-23), a Catherine-class minesweeper.

See also

References

Royal Navy ship names